Ttukseom Park Station is a rapid transit station  on Seoul Subway Line 7. It is located in Noyu-dong in the Gwangjin-gu administrative district of Seoul. It is the only station in South Korea to be located on the underside of a bridge, beneath Cheongdam Bridge. The station also runs underneath a highway with two exits being south of the highway and two north. The south exits serve Ttukseom Park, while the north exits serve Noyu-dong which is administered by and consists of Jayang 3-dong and Jayang 4-dong which contain some residential towers with small shops and other mixed commercial and residential areas. The station is serviced by a single bus route which is located at exit 4. Before Line 7 opened the station was known as Jayang Station (자양역).

Station layout

History
Ttukseom Park Station was opened on August 1, 2000. It was part of the last section of Line 7 to be completed creating a continuous track from Jangam Station to Onsu Station.

Facilities
The station is elevated with 2 side platforms. At either end of the station are two exits; however, the station is not continuous. It is interrupted by the highway that runs perpendicular to it. There are elevators at both ends of the station. The south part of the station exits directly into Ttukseom Resort. The resort is a river park which has been open since October 2009. The park features a lit fountain, swimming pool, restaurants, boat rentals, walking paths, climbing wall and bicycle rentals.

In the past, festivals have been held in the area and it has been the home of the Beautiful Flea Market since 2004 which is run by The Beautiful Store.

The north side of the platform allows access to the only bus route serving the station. As well it provides direct access to Noyu-dong. The area immediately around the station is mainly high-rise residential towers with commercial space on the lower floors. While Jayang 4-dong contains primarily low-rise residential and mixed-use development, Jayang 3-dong is mainly high-rise development.

Average Daily Ridership

References

Metro stations in Gwangjin District
Seoul Metropolitan Subway stations
Railway stations opened in 2000